Par River may refer to several rivers:
 Par River, Cornwall, England
 Par River (Gujarat), India
 Par River (Arunachal Pradesh), India